Kotha Prabhakar Reddy is an Indian politician who won in 2014 a by-election held for the Medak (Lok Sabha constituency) being Telangana Rashtra Samithi candidate. He won by a margin of 3,61,833 votes in the by-poll which was a major shock for the oppositions who had expected the ruling party to lose their seat after the TRS party head K. Chandrashekhar Rao had resigned from the seat after taking oath as the chief minister of the newly formed state Telangana.

Kotha Prabhakar Reddy has been born to a Farmer and has a humble beginning.

References

External links
 Official biographical sketch on the Parliament of India website

India MPs 2014–2019
Lok Sabha members from Telangana
People from Telangana
Telangana politicians
Place of birth missing (living people)
Living people
1966 births
People from Medak district
India MPs 2019–present